Arthur Mooney (14 December 1924 – 30 July 1988) was an Australian rules footballer who played with Richmond in the Victorian Football League (VFL).

Mooney, who arrived at the club from the Richmond Recruits, was a half forward flanker.

He was a member of the Richmond team which lost the 1944 VFL Grand Final.

His 49 goals in the 1946 VFL season were enough to top Richmond's goal-kicking.

References

1924 births
Australian rules footballers from Victoria (Australia)
Richmond Football Club players
1988 deaths